Hearts of Humanity is a 1932 American drama film, directed by Christy Cabanne. It stars Jean Hersholt, Jackie Searl, and J. Farrell MacDonald, and was released on September 1, 1932.

Cast list
 Jean Hersholt as Sol Bloom
 Jackie Searl as Shandy
 J. Farrell MacDonald as Tom O'Hara
 Claudia Dell as Ruth Sneider
 Charles Delaney as Tom Varney
 Lucille La Verne as Mrs. Sneider
 Dick Wallace as Joey Bloom
 George Humbert as Tony
 Betty Jane Graham as Hilda
 John Vosburgh as Dave Haller

References

External links 
 
 
 

Films directed by Christy Cabanne
Majestic Pictures films
American drama films
1932 drama films
1932 films
American black-and-white films
1930s American films